Braco  is a village in Perth and Kinross, Scotland, with a population of 515.

History 
Roman occupation on the Gask Ridge stretching across Scotland included the Roman Fort of Ardoch located to the north of Braco. The ramparts and ditches of the Roman camp are still plainly visible and it is a scheduled monument.

In 1442 over thirty pieces of land were confirmed to Michael Ochiltree, the Bishop of Dunblane, by King James II of Scotland. These included the Braco estate, which at the time was known as Brecache. "Breac Achadh" means "Spotted Field" in Gaelic, i.e. a field partly cleared of bracken.

A permanent fixture at the nearby Lodge Park is the Knaik or Knaick Bridge which dates from the 15th century. An interpretation board for the village and parking for the fort is also by the park entrance.

The village of Braco was established in 1815 following the sale or feu of lands owned by James Masterson. The village marked the bicentenary in 2015 with events timed around the issuing of the first feus in May.

Notable residents 
Famous past residents of Braco have included the founder of the Football League, William McGregor, computer game designer, Chris Sawyer and artist, Ronald Forbes.

The anatomist Robert Howden FRSE was born here in 1856.

Amenities 

Braco is home to a village shop, coffee outlet and outreach post office two garages, including a filling station.

 Ardoch Church, part of the Church of Scotland and linked with Blackford 
 The former Free Church on Church Street/ Feddal Road, 
 An artists' studio on Smiddy Brae which is home to Lys Hansen.
 The Braco Hotel, as of March 2015, being restored and extended.
  On Feddal Road there is Braco Primary School and nursery class (serving Braco and Greenloaning www.pkc.gov.uk/article/17513/Greenloaning-Primary-School) village hall, playpark and a bowling green.
 There is also a recycling point, managed by Perth and Kinross Council.
 The Lodge Park is home to the annual Braco Show, an agricultural event.
 Braco and its immediate surrounds are part of a network of core paths and walking routes through Strathallan, one of which passes a picnic area by the Keir Burn.

Media coverage 
Braco is served by four paid for newspapers: the Strathearn Herald, the Perthshire Advertiser and the Stirling Observer. It is also covered by the Perthshire edition of the Courier, based in Dundee. 
Because of its location it also receives local radio stations which cover both central Scotland and Perthshire, such as Central FM and Tay AM/FM.

Transport 
Braco is served by buses run by Stagecoach, linking the village with Stirling, Dunblane and Crieff, and Docherty's Midland Coaches/Stagecoach to Perth, introduced in June 2014.
The nearest train stations are south at Dunblane and north-east at Gleneagles.

See also 
 William Duff, 1st Earl Fife
 Ronald Forbes (artist)
 William McGregor
 Kate Nevin - Witch of Monzie
 Andrew Lawrenceson Smith

References

External links 

 About Braco at Perthshire-Scotland.co.uk

Villages in Perth and Kinross